is a 2013 Japanese animated historical drama film written and directed by Hayao Miyazaki, animated by Studio Ghibli for the Nippon Television Network, Dentsu, Hakuhodo DY Media Partners, Walt Disney Japan, Mitsubishi, Toho and KDDI. It was released in Japan on 20 July 2013 by Toho, and in North America by Touchstone Pictures on 21 February 2014.

The Wind Rises is a fictionalised biographical film of Jiro Horikoshi (1903–1982), designer of the Mitsubishi A5M fighter aircraft and its successor, the Mitsubishi A6M Zero, used by the Empire of Japan during World War II. The film was adapted from Miyazaki's manga of the same name, which itself combines elements from two unrelated sources; Tatsuo Hori's 1937 semi-autobiographical novel The Wind Has Risen and the life of Jiro Horikoshi.

The Wind Rises was the highest-grossing Japanese film in Japan in 2013. It received critical acclaim, with praise for its animation, music, and emotional weight, though some opinions were mixed regarding the film's subject matter. It was nominated for several awards, including the Academy Award for Best Animated Feature, the Golden Globe Award for Best Foreign Language Film, and the Japan Academy Prize for Animation of the Year, winning the latter.

Plot 

In 1916, a young Jiro Horikoshi longs to become a pilot, but his nearsightedness prevents it. One night, he dreams of his idol, the Italian aircraft designer Giovanni Battista Caproni, who tells him that he has never flown a plane in his life, and that building planes is better than flying them. Seven years later after World War I ended, Jiro is traveling by train to study aeronautical engineering at Tokyo Imperial University and meets a young girl, Nahoko Satomi, traveling with her maid. When the Great Kantō earthquake hits, Nahoko's maid's leg is broken and Jiro helps Nahoko carry her to Nahoko's family home, leaving without giving his name.

In 1925, Jiro graduates with his friend Kiro Honjo and both are employed at aircraft manufacturer Mitsubishi, assigned to design a fighter plane, the Mitsubishi 1MF9, for the Imperial Army. During a test, it breaks apart in midair and is rejected. Dispirited about what he perceives as the backwardness of Japanese aircraft technology, Jiro is sent with Honjo to the Weimar Republic in 1929 to carry out technical research and obtain a production license for a Junkers G.38 aircraft. Jiro dreams again of Caproni, who tells him that the world is better for the beauty of planes, even if humankind might put them to terrible purposes.

In early 1932, Jiro is promoted to chief designer for a fighter plane competition sponsored by the Imperial Navy, but his design, the Mitsubishi 1MF10, fails testing in 1933 and is rejected. Disappointed, he goes to a summer resort in Karuizawa to rest, where he meets Nahoko again. Hans Castorp, a German visitor privately critical of the Nazi regime, tells Jiro, who intends to visit Dessau, that Hugo Junkers is in trouble for fighting Nazism and that Germany will go to war again and must be stopped.

Later, Jiro asks Nahoko's father for his blessing to marry her, and the two are engaged. However, Nahoko has tuberculosis and wants to wait until she recovers to marry. Castorp assists in the romance before fleeing arrest by the Japanese secret police. Wanted in connection with Castorp, Jiro hides at his supervisor's home while he works on a new fighter aircraft project for the Imperial Navy. Following a lung hemorrhage, Nahoko recovers in a mountain sanatorium but cannot bear being apart from Jiro and returns to marry him. Jiro's sister Kayo, a doctor, warns Jiro that his marriage to Nahoko will end tragically as tuberculosis is incurable. Though Nahoko's health deteriorates, she and Jiro enjoy their time together.

Jiro leaves for the test flight of his new prototype aircraft, the Mitsubishi A5M. Knowing that she will die soon, Nahoko returns to the sanatorium, leaving letters for Jiro, her family, and friends. At the test site, Jiro is distracted from his success by a gust of wind, suggesting Nahoko's passing. In the summer of 1945, after Japan lost World War II, Jiro dreams of Caproni again, regretting that his aircraft was used for war. Caproni comforts him, saying that Jiro's dream of building beautiful aircraft was nonetheless realized. Nahoko appears, encouraging her husband to live his life to the fullest. Jiro and Caproni walk together into their shared kingdom of dreams.

Voice cast

Production

Development 

The Wind Rises was directed by Hayao Miyazaki, whose previous films include My Neighbor Totoro, Princess Mononoke and Spirited Away. It was the first film Miyazaki solely directed since Ponyo in 2008.

Miyazaki began to conceive a story to illustrate the life of Jiro Horikoshi in 2008. He published the story as a manga series in the monthly magazine  Model Graphix from April 2009 to January 2010, with the title borrowed from Tatsuo Hori's novel The Wind Has Risen.

The story in the manga follows the historical account of Horikoshi's aircraft development up to 1935 (the year of the Mitsubishi A5M's maiden flight), and intertwines with fictional encounters with Caproni and Nahoko Satomi. The scenes with Nahoko in the manga were adopted from the novel The Wind Has Risen, in which Tatsuo Hori wrote about his life experience with his fiancée, Ayako Yano, before she died from tuberculosis. The name Nahoko Satomi was borrowed from the female protagonist of another novel by Tatsuo Hori, Nahoko. In real life however, Horikoshi's wife was called Sumako; she was not sickly, and their marriage produced six children.

Characters frequently discuss Thomas Mann's novel The Magic Mountain, and, in a letter to Nahoko, Jiro names his fleeing German friend "Mr. Castorp" after its protagonist. The character himself is a caricature of Stephen Alpert, who was once the executive director of Ghibli's international division. He left the company in 2011 for personal reasons, but was instrumental in Ghibli's overseas expansion. He was asked to return to Japan to model for the character's appearance and a suitable voice.

After the release of Ponyo, Miyazaki wanted his next film to be a sequel, Ponyo on the Cliff by the Sea II, but producer Toshio Suzuki proposed to adopt the manga The Wind Has Risen instead. At first, Miyazaki rejected the proposal because he created the manga as a hobby and considered its subjects not suitable for children, the traditional audience of Studio Ghibli's features. However, he changed his mind when a staff member suggested that "children should be allowed to be exposed to subjects they are not familiar with". He was also inspired to make the film after reading a quote from Horikoshi: "All I wanted to do was to make something beautiful".

Music 

The film's score was composed and conducted by Joe Hisaishi, and performed by the Yomiuri Nippon Symphony Orchestra.

The film also includes singer-songwriter Yumi Matsutoya's 1973 song . Producer Suzuki recommended "Hikōki-gumo" to Miyazaki in December 2012, feeling the lyrics resembled the story of The Wind Rises.

The film's soundtrack was released in Japan on 17 July 2013 by Tokuma Japan Communications.

Das gibt's nur einmal (English: It only happens once) is the German song Hans Castorp sings while playing the piano at Hotel Kusakaru in the film. Jiro Horikoshi and Nahoko's father later join the singing. The song was composed by Werner Richard Heymann for the German movie Der Kongreß tanzt.

Release 
The Wind Rises was to have been released simultaneously with The Tale of the Princess Kaguya, another Ghibli film by Isao Takahata, in Japan in mid-2013. It would have been the first time the two directors' works were released together since the release of My Neighbor Totoro and Grave of the Fireflies in 1988. However, Princess Kaguya was delayed until 23 November 2013, and The Wind Rises was released on 20 July 2013.

The film played in competition at the 70th Venice International Film Festival. It had its official North American premiere at the 2013 Toronto International Film Festival, although a sneak preview was presented earlier at the 2013 Telluride Film Festival, outside of the official program.

Walt Disney Studios Motion Pictures distributed the film in North America through its Touchstone Pictures banner. English dubbing was directed by Gary Rydstrom. Disney held a one-week release window in the Los Angeles theatrical circuit beginning on 8 November 2013, so that it could qualify for Academy Awards consideration. It was released theatrically on 21 February 2014 in select cities, with wide release on 28 February. It was released in the United Kingdom on 9 May 2014 by StudioCanal.

Home media 
Walt Disney Studios Japan released the movie on Blu-ray Disc and DVD in Japan on 18 June 2014. The Japanese DVD release sold 128,784 units until 7 December 2014 and a further 6,735 units between 8 December 2014 and 7 June 2015, for a combined  DVD units .

In the United States, Walt Disney Studios Home Entertainment released the film on Blu-ray Disc and DVD on 18 November 2014. The release includes supplement features with storyboards, the original Japanese trailers and TV spots, a "Behind the Microphone" featurette with members of the English voice cast, and a video from when the film was announced to be completed. The audio for both English and Japanese language is monophonic (DTS-HD MA 1.0). Even though the North American rights Disney owned on Studio Ghibli films expired in 2017, Walt Disney Studios Home Entertainment continued to distribute The Wind Rises until 2020, when GKIDS re-released it on DVD and Blu-ray on 22 September 2020 with distribution through Shout! Factory. The re-release took longer than with other Studio Ghibli titles as it was still a fairly new film, and Disney still held the US rights.

In the United Kingdom, it was 2015's fifth best-selling foreign-language film on home video, and third best-selling Asian film (below The Raid 2 and The Tale of the Princess Kaguya).

Reception

Box office 
The film grossed  at the Japanese box office, the highest-grossing film in Japan in 2013.

Critical response 
Review aggregator Rotten Tomatoes sampled 180 reviews and judged 88% of them positive, giving the film a "Certified Fresh" rating, with an average score of 8/10. The consensus states: "The Wind Rises is a fittingly bittersweet swan song for director Hayao Miyazaki". Metacritic, which assigns a weighted average score, rated the film an 83/100 based on 41 reviews, citing "universal acclaim".

Critic David Ehrlich rated the film 9.7/10 and called it "perhaps the greatest animated film ever made." He wrote: "While initially jarring, Miyazaki's unapologetic deviations from fact help The Wind Rises to transcend the linearity of its expected structure, the film eventually revealing itself to be less of a biopic than it is a devastatingly honest lament for the corruption of beauty, and how invariably pathetic the human response to that loss must be. Miyazaki’s films are often preoccupied with absence, the value of things left behind and how the ghosts of beautiful things are traced onto our memories like the shadows of objects outlined by a nuclear flash. The Wind Rises looks back as only a culminating work can." Peter Bradshaw of The Guardian called the film "visually exquisite and emotionally charged". Film critic Mark Kermode called it "a rich treat for the eye and soul alike.".

The Japan Times gave the film 3  stars out of 5, and stated, "A visually sumptuous celebration of an unspoiled prewar Japan." In a review for The Asia-Pacific Journal, Matthew Penney wrote: "What Miyazaki offers is a layered look at how Horikoshi's passion for flight was captured by capital and militarism"; and that it was "one of Miyazaki's most ambitious and thought-provoking visions as well as one of his most beautifully realized visual projects".

Controversy 
In Japan, The Wind Rises received criticism from both the Japanese political right and from the Japan Society for Tobacco Control. Miyazaki added to the controversy by publishing an essay in which he criticized the proposal by Japan's right-wing Liberal Democratic Party to change Article 9 of the Japanese Constitution to allow Japan to remilitarize.

Miyazaki also attracted political criticism from Korean internet users, who argued that the Zero represents Japanese military aggression and that many planes were assembled by Korean forced labour. In response, Miyazaki noted to Korean journalists that "[Horikoshi] was someone who resisted demands from the military...I wonder if he should be liable for anything just because he lived in that period." In an interview with the Asahi Shimbun, Miyazaki said he had "very complex feelings" about World War II since, as a pacifist, he felt militarist Japan had acted out of "foolish arrogance". However, he also said that the Zero plane "represented one of the few things we Japanese could be proud of—[they] were a truly formidable presence, and so were the pilots who flew them".

Accolades 
The Wind Rises received 13 nominations and 17 awards for "Best Animated Feature", including one Academy Award nomination. Hayao Miyazaki won the award for Writing in an Animated Feature Production at the 41st Annie Awards. The film's musical composer, Joe Hisaishi, received the Japan Academy Prize for Best Music Score. The film was also selected as "Audience Favorite – Animation" at the Mill Valley Film Festival.

See also 
 The Kingdom of Dreams and Madness, a 2013 documentary about the making of the film.
The Eternal Zero, a 2013 live-action drama film based on a novel of the same name that also features the Zero fighter plane
 Porco Rosso, a 1992 Ghibli animated film also directed by Miyazaki which contains a number of similar thematic elements.
 The Cockpit, a similar 1993 anime OVA focusing on World War II Axis allegiances, also featuring an emphasis on the warplanes.
 Grave of the Fireflies, another Ghibli anime film from 1988 covering the Japanese perspective on World War II and its effects on civilians.

References

External links 

 
 
 
 
 
 
 

2013 anime films
2013 drama films
2013 films
2010s biographical drama films
2010s historical drama films
2010s Japanese-language films
1923 Great Kantō earthquake
Animated films about aviation
Animated films based on actual events
Animated films based on novels
Anime films based on manga
Annie Award winners
Anti-war films
Anti-war films about World War II
Drama anime and manga
Drama films based on actual events
Existentialist anime and manga
Films about dreams
Films about earthquakes
Films directed by Hayao Miyazaki
Films scored by Joe Hisaishi
Films set in 1918
Films set in 1923
Films set in 1927
Films set in 1929
Films set in 1932
Films set in 1933
Films set in 1945
Films set in Germany
Films set in Japan
Historical anime and manga
Japan Academy Prize for Animation of the Year winners
Japanese adult animated films
Japanese aviation films
Japanese biographical drama films
Japanese historical drama films
Marriage in anime and manga
Military anime and manga
Nippon TV films
Philosophical anime and manga
Romance anime and manga
Slice of life anime and manga
Studio Ghibli animated films
Toho animated films
Toho films
War in anime and manga
Works about earthquakes
World War II aviation films